John "Liver-Eating" Johnson, born John Jeremiah Garrison Johnston (July 1, 1824 – January 21, 1900), was a mountain man of the American Old West.

Biography
Johnson is said to have been born with the last name Garrison, in the area of the Hickory Tavern near Pattenburg, New Jersey.  During the Mexican–American War he served aboard a fighting ship.  After striking an officer, he deserted, changed his name to John Johnston, and traveled west to try his hand at gold digging in Alder Gulch, Montana Territory.  He also became a "woodhawk," supplying cord wood to steamboats. 

Rumors and legends about Johnson are common. Perhaps chief among them is that in 1847, his wife, a member of the Flathead American Indian tribe, was killed by a young Crow brave and his fellow hunters, which prompted Johnson to embark on a vendetta against the tribe. According to historian Andrew Mehane Southerland, "He supposedly killed and scalped more than 300 Crow Indians and then devoured their livers" to avenge the death of his wife, and "As his reputation and collection of scalps grew, Johnson became an object of fear."

Accounts say that he would cut out and eat the liver of each Crow killed. This led to his being known as "Liver-Eating Johnson". The Blackfoot planned to sell him to the Crow, his mortal enemies. He was stripped to the waist, tied  with leather thongs and put in a teepee with one guard. Johnson managed to break through the straps. He then knocked out the guard with a kick, took his knife and scalped him.

Eventually, Johnson made peace with the Crow, who became "his brothers", and his personal vendetta against them finally ended after 25 years and scores of slain Crow warriors. However, the West was still very violent and territorial, particularly during the Plains Indian Wars of the mid-19th century. Many more Indians of different tribes, especially but not limited to the Sioux and the Blackfoot, would know the wrath of "Dapiek Absaroka" Crow killer and his fellow mountain men.

Johnson joined Company H, 2nd Colorado Cavalry, of the Union Army in St. Louis in 1864 as a private and was honorably discharged the following year. During the 1880s, he was appointed deputy sheriff in Coulson, Montana, and a town marshal in Red Lodge, Montana. In his time, he was a sailor, scout, soldier, gold seeker, hunter, trapper, woodhawk, whiskey peddler, guide, deputy, constable, and log cabin builder, taking advantage of any source of income-producing labor he could find. His final residence was in a veterans’ home in Santa Monica, California, where he died on January 21, 1900. His body was buried in a Los Angeles veterans' cemetery. However, in 1974, after a six-month campaign led by 25 seventh-grade students and their teacher, Johnson's remains were relocated to Cody, Wyoming. His epitaph reads "No More Trails"

Jeremiah Johnson is a 1972 film by Sydney Pollack starring Robert Redford depicting his life.

References

Further reading 
 Jon Axline, "In League with the Devil: Boone Helm and 'Liver-Eatin' Johnston'," in, Still Speaking Ill of the Dead: More Jerks in Montana History, edited by Jon Axline and Jodie Foley. Guilford, Connecticut and Helena, Montana: Two Dot,Globe Pequot Press, 2005.
 Nathan E. Bender, "Perceptions of a Mountain Man: John "Jeremiah Liver-Eating" Johnston at Old Trail Town, Cody, Wyoming."  The Rocky Mountain Fur Trade Journal v.1 (2007): 93-106.  Published by Museum of the Mountain Man, Pinedale, Wyoming.
 Nathan E. Bender, "The Abandoned Scout’s Revenge: Origins of the Crow Killer Saga of Liver-Eating Johnson," Annals of Wyoming v. 78 n. 4 (Autumn 2006): 2-17. Published by the Wyoming State Historical Society.
 Nathan E. Bender, "A Hawken Rifle and Bowie Knife of John ‘Liver-Eating’ Johnson," Arms & Armour: Journal of the Royal Armouries, v. 3 n. 2 (October 2006): 159-170.
 William T. Hamilton, Journal of a Mountaineer edited by Douglas W. Ellison, Western Edge Book Distributing: Medora, ND, 2010
 Jim Annin, They Gazed on the Beartooths, v. 2 (1964): 225-227
 McLelland, Dennis J., "The Avenging Fury of the Plains: John Liver Eating Johnston," Infinity Publishing , 2008
 Felton & Fowler's Famous Americans You Never Knew Existed, By Bruce Felton and Mark Fowler, Stein and Day, 1979 
 The Never-Ending Lives of Liver-Eating Johnson by D. J. Herda (2019). TWODOT Books

External links
 
 

1824 births
1900 deaths
19th-century sailors
American cannibals
American folklore
American fur traders
American gold prospectors
American hunters
American serial killers
Lawmen of the American Old West
Loggers from Montana
Male serial killers
Montana articles lacking sources
Montana sheriffs
Mountain men
People from Billings, Montana
People from Los Angeles
People from New Jersey
Union Army soldiers
United States Navy personnel of the Mexican–American War